The Canon EOS R7 is an advanced APS-C mirrorless interchangeable-lens camera produced by Canon. The camera was announced by Canon on May 24, 2022 and released in Japan on June 23, 2022 Alongside the Canon EOS R10, the R7 is the first of two APS-C cameras in Canon's EOS R lineup. Two RF-S mount lenses were offered as kit lenses with the R7: the RF-S 18-150mm f/3.6-6.3 IS STM and the RF-S 18-45 f/4.5-6.3 IS STM.

Main features
The R7 serves as Canon's top line APS-C camera, which was previously served by the 7D Mark II DSLR from 2014. Concurrently, the R7 adopts the 32.5-megapixel image sensor previously seen in the 90D, while continuing to deliver improvements brought about by the DIGIC X image processor and Canon's switch to a mirrorless system.

These are the main features of the R7:
 32.5-megapixel APS-C CMOS sensor 
 Dual Pixel CMOS AF II with human, animal and vehicle tracking 
 High-speed continuous shooting of up to 15 fps with mechanical shutter, and up to 30fps with electronic shutter 
 Sensor shift in-body image stabilization with can provide up to 8 stops of shake correction 
 4K/60 video recording capability with 64% sensor crop, or 100% crop video recording at 4K/30 oversampled from 7K resolution 
 1080p video recording at up to 120 fps 
 HDR PQ or Canon Log 3 video recording 
 100% autofocus coverage (with Auto selection) 
 5,915 autofocus points, with 651 autofocus areas when automatically selected 
 Native ISO range of 100 to 32000; expandable to 51200 
 0.39" 2.36 million dots OLED electronic viewfinder with 60/120fps selectable refresh rate, and a vari-angle LCD touchscreen 
 Dual UHS-II SD memory card slots 
 USB 3.2 Gen 2 Type-C connector for charging and data transfer 
 Built-in Wi-Fi and Bluetooth connectivity
 DIGIC X image processor

Images

References

External links

  

Canon RF-mount cameras
Cameras introduced in 2022
Digital photography